Frederiksværk Gymnasium is a gymnasium (upper secondary school) in central Frederiksværk, Denmark. The building was designed by Kjær & Richter and was inaugurated in 1980.

Notable alumni
 1990: Tomas Villum Jensen, actor and film director
 1991: Anders Thomas Jensen, screenwriter and film director

References

External links
 Official website

Buildings and structures in Halsnæs Municipality
Gymnasiums in Denmark
School buildings completed in 1980